This article lists some of the events that took place in the Netherlands in 2000.

Incumbents
Monarch: Beatrix
Prime Minister: Wim Kok

Events
January 27 - Gerrit Komrij is chosen as poet of the fatherland.
January 29 - Paul Scheffer's essay on the multicultural drama appears in the NRC Handelsblad.
February 14 - The first episode of De Bus airs on TV. 
April 22 - Six Flags Holland reopens with 4 new roller-coasters. 
April 23 - Beginning of Emperor Akihito's state visit to the Netherlands.
June 22 - A 10-year-old girl is murdered in the Beatrixpark of Schiedam.
July 2 : France wins the UEFA European Championship by defeating Italy, 2–1 following a golden goal in the final game at the Stadion Feijenoord in Rotterdam, Netherlands.
May 13 – Fireworks disaster in Enschede killing 23 and destroying an entire neighbourhood.
September 15 - Expedition Robinson airs for the first time on Dutch TV. 
 October 1 - The ban on brothels is lifted. 
October 22 - Communist activist and former secretary of the Red Youth, Lucien van Hoesel dies due to an intracranial hemorrhage.
 December 16 - Beginning of a 3-day revolt in the Graafsewijk neighborhood in 's-Hertogenbosch.
 December 19 - The Hells Angels invade the RTL-studio where TV presenters Frits Barend and Henk van Dorp are abused for spending too much time on Sam Klepper's funeral, which was under escort of the Hells Angels. They apologize on air and don't press any charges.

Business
March 17 – World Online is floated on the Amsterdam stock exchange
April 13 - Nina Brink is fired as the chairwoman of the commissary council of World Online

Sports
 1999–2000 Eredivisie
 1999–2000 Eerste Divisie
 1999–2000 KNVB Cup
April 22 - German Erik Zabel wins the Amstel Gold Race
May 21 - The Netherlands play their 1000th international hockey match in Amstelveen.
June 3 - The women's national field hockey team win the Champions Trophy for a 2nd time. 
June 4 - The men's national field hockey team win the Champions Trophy for a 5th time. 
June 10 - 2000 UEFA European Football Championship begin, the event is co-hosted by The Netherlands and Belgium.
June 29 - The Netherlands are eliminated from 2000 UEFA European Football Championship by losing to Italy in the semi-finals on penalties. 
July 2 - 2000 UEFA European Football Championship ends in Rotterdam with France beating Italy in the final, 2-1 after extra time.
September 19 - Pieter van den Hoogenband wins an Olympic gold medal in Sydney on the 100 freestyle in a record time of 47.84.
September 30 - The Dutch national men field hockey team beat South Korea in the final to win the Olympic gold medal.
October 15 - Spaniard Francisco Javier Cortes wins the Amsterdam Marathon

Births
 January 11 – Marrit Steenbergen, swimmer
 January 23 – Kjell Scherpen, footballer

See also
2000 in Dutch television

References

 
2000s in the Netherlands